Lydia Panas (born 1958 in Philadelphia) is an American photographer.

Biography
Panas holds degrees from Boston College, the School of Visual Arts, and New York University and received an independent study fellowship from the Whitney Museum.

She has photographed for The New York Times and exhibited in the US and abroad. Her book The Mark of Abel was named one of Photo District News Books of 2012 as well as best coffee table book by the Daily Beast. She has been invited to teach classes and lecture in various colleges and venues, including the Museum of Modern Art,  Lafayette, Muhlenberg, Cedar Crest, Moravian, and others.

Panas lives in Kutztown, Pennsylvania.

Her work is included in the collection of the Museum of Fine Arts Houston the Center for Photography at Woodstock, and the Brooklyn Museum of Art.

References

External links
Official website
The 2017 Women's March exhibition, Lens/cratch, 8 March 2017

1958 births
Living people
20th-century American photographers
21st-century American photographers
Artists from Philadelphia
Photographers from Pennsylvania
Boston College alumni
School of Visual Arts alumni
New York University alumni
20th-century American women photographers
21st-century American women photographers